XHRCF-FM is a noncommercial radio station on 94.7 FM in Tuxtla Gutiérrez, Chiapas. It is owned by José Rodolfo Calvo Fonseca and is known as La Nueva FM 94.7.

History
XHRCF received its permit on August 29, 2012. It is co-owned with the Chiapas Hoy newspaper.

References

Radio stations in Chiapas